Abhinetri is a 1970 Indian Hindi film produced and directed by Subodh Mukherjee. The film stars Shashi Kapoor, Hema Malini, Nirupa Roy, Nazima, Asit Sen and Deb Mukherjee. The music composed by Laxmikant Pyarelal includes the song "Sa Re Ga Ma Pa" by Lata Mangeshkar and Kishore Kumar, besides the hit Lata Mangeshkar solo "O Ghata Sanwari".

Plot 
A chance meeting between an Assistant Scientist, Shekar, and an established stage dancer and singer, Anjana, results in love. While Shekar has a mother who lives separately, Anjana has been orphaned at an early age. Shekar's mother approves of Anjana and both get married. Anjana stops her involvement in dancing and singing, and both spent the next several months in relative harmony. Then Anjana finds that Shekar is spending more and more time in the laboratory than with her, and she decides to take up dancing and singing, which does not sit well with Shekar. Arguments ensue, and both decide to live separately. When Shekar's mother comes to visit Shekar, both he and Anjana compromise to live together. This, they think, would provide relief to their mother in her old age. Living together, they discover the missing spice in their marriage at the end.

Cast 
 Shashi Kapoor as Shekhar
 Hema Malini as Anjana
 Nirupa Roy as Shekhar's Mother
 Nazir Hussain as Dr. Niranjan Das
 Asit Sen as Narayan
 Badri Prasad as Anjana's Uncle
 Bela Bose
 Deb Mukherjee as Dancer (song "Milte Hi Rahenge Hum")

Soundtrack 
All songs were written by Majrooh Sultanpuri.

References

External links 
 

1970 films
1970s Hindi-language films
Films scored by Laxmikant–Pyarelal
Films about actors